"The Feeling" is a single by English disc jockey DJ Fresh, released as the fourth single from his album Nextlevelism. RaVaughn is the main vocalist. It was released on 23 September 2012 in the United Kingdom as a digital download on iTunes.

Music video
The music video was produced in Japan and was directed by Ivan Oglivie. Everyone is riding mopeds that are relatively futuristic. The basis for the music video is about youth and fulfilment thus the title "The Feeling" as in a feeling of ecstasy which is a familiar theme throughout the music video.

Track listings

Chart performance

Release history

References

2012 singles
DJ Fresh songs
Dubstep songs
Ministry of Sound singles
2012 songs
Song recordings produced by DJ Fresh
Songs written by DJ Fresh